Gayakapriya (pronounced gāyakapriya) is a ragam in Carnatic music (musical scale of South Indian classical music). It is the 13th Melakarta rāgam in the 72 melakarta rāgam system of Carnatic music.

It is called Geyahejjujji in Muthuswami Dikshitar school of Carnatic music.

Structure and Lakshana

It is the 1st rāgam in the 3rd chakra Agni. The mnemonic name is Agni-Pa. The mnemonic phrase is sa ra gu ma pa dha na. Its  structure (ascending and descending scale) is as follows (see swaras in Carnatic music for details on below notation and terms):
: 
: 
(the notes used in this scale are shuddha rishabham, antara gandharam, shuddha madhyamam, shuddha dhaivatham, shuddha nishadham)

As it is a melakarta rāgam, by definition it is a sampoorna rāgam (has all seven notes in ascending and descending scale). It is the shuddha madhyamam equivalent of Dhavalambari, which is the 49th melakarta.

Asampurna Melakarta 
Geyahejjujji is the 13th Melakarta in the original list compiled by Venkatamakhin. The notes used in the scale are the same, but the ascending scale is different and vakra (zig-zag usage of notes in phrases of the scale). It is an shadava-sampurna raga (6 notes in ascending scale, while full 7 are used in descending scale).
: 
:

Janya rāgams 
Gayakapriya has a few minor janya rāgams (derived scales) associated with it, of which Kalagada is heard occasionally in concerts. See List of janya rāgams to see all the rāgams associated with Gayakapriya.

Compositions
Here are a few common compositions sung in concerts, set to Gayakapriya.
Nada nilai by Koteeswara Iyer
Sri Mahavishnum by Dr. M. Balamuralikrishna

Muthuswami Dikshitar's composition Ramachandra bhakthum is set to Geyahejjujji rāgam.

Related rāgams
This section covers the theoretical and scientific aspect of this rāgam.

Gayakapriya's notes when shifted using Graha bhedam, yields a minor melakarta rāgam Dhatuvardani. Graha bhedam is the step taken in keeping the relative note frequencies same, while shifting the shadjam to the next note in the rāgam. For further details and an illustration refer Graha bhedam on Gayakapriya.

Notes

References

Melakarta ragas